Michel de La Vigne (1588, Vernon, Eure – 1648) was a French physician.

1588 births
1648 deaths
People from Vernon, Eure
17th-century French physicians